The 2005 WNBA Season was the Women's National Basketball Association's ninth season. The season ended with the Sacramento Monarchs winning their first WNBA Championship.

Regular season standings
Eastern Conference

Western Conference

Season award winners

Playoffs

Coaches

Eastern Conference
Charlotte Sting: Trudi Lacey and Tyrone Bogues
Connecticut Sun: Mike Thibault
Detroit Shock: Bill Laimbeer
Indiana Fever: Brian Winters
New York Liberty: Pat Coyle
Washington Mystics: Richie Adubato

Western Conference
Houston Comets: Van Chancellor
Los Angeles Sparks: Henry Bibby and Joe Bryant
Minnesota Lynx: Suzie McConnell Serio
Phoenix Mercury: Carrie Graf
Sacramento Monarchs: John Whisenant
San Antonio Silver Stars: Dan Hughes
Seattle Storm: Anne Donovan

External links
Final 2005 WNBA Season Standings
2005 WNBA Award Winners
2005 WNBA Playoffs

 
2005 in American women's basketball
2004–05 in American basketball by league
2005–06 in American basketball by league
Women's National Basketball Association seasons